AFLM may refer to:

 AFLM, a type of Pointer machine in theoretical computer science
 AflM, involved in the production of Aflatoxin B1
 Australian Football League, an Australian football league sometimes referred to as AFLM (AFL men's), especially when in relation to AFL Women's